James Edward Baggott (born 2 March 1957) is a British science writer living in Reading, Berkshire, England who writes about science, philosophy and science history. Baggott is the author of nine books, including Farewell to Reality: How Modern Physics Has Betrayed the Search for Scientific Truth (also titled Farewell to Reality: How Fairy-tale Physics Betrays the Search for Scientific Truth), Origins: The Scientific Story of Creation, Higgs: The Invention and Discovery of the God Particle and The Quantum Story: A History in 40 moments.

Early life and education

Baggott told science writer Brian Clegg that the reason why he went into the sciences was because he had some great schoolteachers. He loved physics but did not think he had a strong enough talent for the mathematics that would be required. "That said, my desire to seek explanations for things led me to chemical physics and it was with a great sense of pride and pleasure that I did manage to publish some entirely theoretical research papers, full of mathematical equations!"

He obtained his degree at the University of Manchester in 1978 and his DPhil in chemical physics at the University of Oxford. He worked as a professor for the University of Reading and left academia to work for Shell International Petroleum. After several years he opened his own training and consultancy business. He calls himself a "science communicator" and publishes a science book approximately every 18 months. He selects the topics for his books by writing about things he wants to know more about. The advent of the Internet makes it much easier to do research than back when he first started writing books in the early 1990s.

==Higgs: The Invention and Discovery of the 'God Particle'''==

Baggott felt that scientists from CERN were getting close to discovering the Higgs boson and approached his editor about writing on the topic. His idea was to start writing the book, get about 95% done, and then, when the discovery was announced, he would be able to finish the last 5% and the book would be on the shelves very soon after the announcement. Throughout 2011 and 2012 he kept updating the book, leaving the last 1,500 words unsaid. He watched CERN's live webcast announce the discovery of the boson on 4 July and finished writing the book the next day.

Farewell to Reality: How Modern Physics Has Betrayed the Search for Scientific Truth

Baggott got the idea to write Farewell to Reality: How Modern Physics Has Betrayed the Search for Scientific Truth and become a science activist when watching the BBC program What is Reality. In his opinion, the program started out well, but became what he calls "fairy tale physics" when it included interviews with theoretical physicists who talked about such ideas as multiverse, superstring theory, and supersymmetry. These topics, according to Baggott, are fascinating to read about and are an entertaining way to make documentaries, sell books, or spend time at parties, but are "abstracted, theoretical speculation without any kind of empirical foundation" and "not science". Farewell to Reality is Baggott's attempt to counteract the "fuzzy science theory" and advocate for evidence and facts. Baggott states, "When you start asking 'Do we live in a hologram?' Then you are crossing into metaphysics, and you are heading down the path of allowing all kinds of things that have no evidence to back it up, like creationism."

In an interview with Massimo Pigliucci on the Rationally Thinking podcast, Baggott stated that science is a human endeavour with a "fuzziness around the edges". He went on to say that there are no rules and, when training to be a scientist, no one gives you an instruction book on how to do science. "We kinda make it up as we go along... and it is perfectly reasonable for the scientific community to want to change those rules." Science writer Philip Ball, in a review of Farewell in The Guardian, stated that Baggott was right "although his target is as much the way this science is marketed as what it contains." Ball cautioned Baggott about criticising scientists who speculate because "conjecture injects vitality into science."

Baggott, along with Jon Butterworth, Hilary Rose and Stephen Minger, discussed the idea of futurist science theories with BBC Radio 4 interviewer Allan Little. They discussed the likelihood that string theory and other theories that have yet to show empirical data will eventually be proved. Baggott expressed concern that "a body of professional theorists want to change the definition of what it means to do science". He feels that empirical data provides an anchor for these people to "return to reality" and that science without evidence is "most dangerous".

Beyond Measure

Science writer Tony Hey writes that Beyond Measure was written for graduate and undergraduate physics students as an overview of quantum mechanics. The book has wider appeal by keeping the equations to the appendices for optional review. The book is divided into five parts starting with the history behind quantum theory, followed by the more recent experiments.  "Chapters on consciousness and on the ever-popular many-worlds interpretation of quantum theory form the conclusion."

Awards and honours

Royal Society of Chemistry – Marlow Medal (1989)
Glaxo Science Writers Award (1991)

Publications
Baggott is a regular contributor to New Scientist and Nature.

Books
 Quantum Reality: The Quest for the Real Meaning of Quantum Mechanics - A Game of Theories, (2020), Oxford University Press,   2020
 Quantum Space: Loop Quantum Gravity and the Search for the Structure of Space, Time, and the Universe, (2019), Oxford University Press,   2019

{{Citation
    | author-mask = 0
    | last =Baggott
    | first= Jim
    | title =Higgs: The Invention and Discovery of the 'God Particle'    | publisher = Oxford University Press
    | year=2013
    | pages=304
    | isbn =978-0199679577
    | url=http://www.jimbaggott.com/books/higgs/
 }}

Selected articles
Debate between Baggott and Mike Duff about the limits of physics – The Guardian'', 2013.

References

External links 

1957 births
Living people
English sceptics
21st-century English writers
English science writers
Science activists
Alumni of the University of Manchester
University of Redlands faculty
Alumni of the University of Oxford